Anthene phoenicis, Karsch's ciliate blue, is a butterfly in the family Lycaenidae. It is found in eastern Senegal, Sierra Leone, Burkina Faso, Ivory Coast, Ghana, Togo, southern Nigeria and Cameroon. The habitat consists of forests.

Adult males mud-puddle.

References

Butterflies described in 1893
Anthene
Butterflies of Africa